Disturbio (born March 30, 1979) is the ring name of Israel Aguilar Alvarez, a Mexican luchador, or professional wrestler currently working for the Mexican professional wrestling promotion Consejo Mundial de Lucha Libre (CMLL) portraying a rudo ("bad guy") wrestling character. Aguilar is the husband of luchadora (female wrestler) Princesa Dorada ("Golden Princess"). Disturbio has formed a regular tag team with Bobby Zavala since 2011, although the team does not have an official team name.

Professional wrestling career
Aguilar made his professional wrestling debut on December 22, 2004 On January 31, 2008 Disturbio lost a Lucha de Apuestas, or "bet match", which meant Disturbio had all his hair shaved off. In April, 2008 Disturbio had a try out match for Consejo Mundial de Lucha Libre (CMLL), the world's oldest wrestling promotion, when he teamed up with Zayco to defeat the team of Frisbee and Tiger Kid. On December 14, 2008 he competed in the 2008 version of Toryumon's Young Dragons Cup in a torneo cibernetico, multi-man elimination match that also included Adam Bridle, Miedo, Ministro, Super Camaleon, Trauma I and Trauma II and was won by Satoshi Kajiwara.

Consejo Mundial de Lucha Libre (2009–present)
Disturbio began working regularly for CMLL in 2009, making his Arena Mexico debut on CMLL's main show, Super Viernes on April 9, 2009 as he teamed up with Durango Kid to defeat Bengala and Delta. A week later he was teamed up with El Terrible to participate in the 2010 Gran Alternativa, "Great Alternative Tournament", where a rookie and a veteran wrestler teams up for a tag team tournament. Disturbio and El Terrible lost to Atlantis and Inquisidor in the opening round. In 2001 Disturbio began working regularly with fellow low card rudo Bobby Zavala, forming a regular tag team. Disturbio participated in the first ever Torneo Sangre Nueva ("New Blood Tournament") on March 6, 2012 but was eliminated in the preliminary torneo cibernetico elimination match when he was pinned by Super Halcón Jr. after having pinned Robin earlier in the match. In the fall of 2012 Disturbio and Zavala began a long running, escalating storyline against the tecnico ("good guy character") team of Leono and Tigre Blanco. The two teams clashed on multiple occasions, building the rivalry until the two teams faced off in a double Luchas de Apuestas match where both teams put their hair on the line in the match. The match took place on January 1, 2013 and saw Leono and Tigre Blanco lose and for the first time in their careers shaved bald as a result of the loss. Disturbio participated in the 2013 Torneo Sangre Nueva, but like in 2012 he was eliminated in the preliminary round by Guerrero Negro, Jr. In late March, 2013 Disturbio was announced as one of the Novatos, or rookies, in the 2013 Torneo Gran Alternativa, or "Great Alternative tournament". The Gran Alternativa pairs a rookie with an experienced wrestler for a tag team tournament. Disturbio would team up with veteran Volador Jr. and compete in Block A on April 12, 2013. The duo defeated Robin and Máximo in the first round, but lost to Guerrero Negro, Jr. and Último Guerrero in the second round. In May, 2015 Disturbio competed in a qualifying match for the 2015 version of En Busca de un Ídolo as one of 16 wrestlers in the qualifying torneo cibernetico elimination match where the last eight wrestlers would qualify for the tournament. He competed against Akuma, Blue Panther Jr., Cancerbero, Canelo Casas, Delta, Esfinge, Flyer, El Gallo, Guerrero Maya Jr., Joker, Pegasso, Raziel, Sagrado, Stigma and Boby Zavala. Disturbio was one of eight wrestlers to qualify for the main portion of the tournament.

Disturbio participated in his first tour of Japan January 10 to 23, 2018 as he participate in CMLL's annual tour of Japan promoted jointly with CMLL's Japanese partner New Japan Pro-Wrestling (NJPW) called Fantastica Mania 2018. He worked all eight tour dates, with notable victories over Star Jr., the team of Star Jr. and Hombre Bala Jr. and the team of Atlantis, Drone (now Hombre Bala Jr.), Místico and Volador Jr. but lost on the other five nights of the tour.

On January 1, 2022, Disturbio participated n the "Sin Salida" (No Exit) special event. The wrestling is inside a cage, where 12 wrestlers (in this case, 11 wrestlers) participate to save their hairs or masks. The participants; Disturbio, Dulce Gardenia, Sangre Imperial, El Audaz, Okumura, El Coyote, Pegasso, Stigma, Espíritu Negro, Akuma and Nitro escaped one by one until Disturbio and Dulce Gardenia had to fight to save their hairs in a round without time limit. At the end of the event, Disturbio had to be shaved.

Luchas de Apuestas record

References

1979 births
Mexican male professional wrestlers
Living people